Ippolito Borghese, O.S.B. (1576–1637) was an Italian Roman Catholic prelate who served as Bishop of Pienza (1636–1637) 
and Bishop of Montalcino (1618–1636).

Biography
Ippolito Borghese, was born in Siena, Italy in 1576 and ordained a priest in the Order of Saint Benedict.
On 26 March 1618, he was appointed during the papacy of Pope Paul V as Bishop of Montalcino.
On 22 April 1618, he was consecrated bishop by Giambattista Leni, Bishop of Ferrara, with Francesco Sacrati, Titular Archbishop of Damascus, and Evangelista Tornioli, Bishop of Città di Castello, serving as co-consecrators. 
On 1 September 1636, he was appointed during the papacy of Pope Urban VIII as Bishop of Pienza.
He served as Bishop of Pienza until his death in March 1637.

References

External links and additional sources
 (for Chronology of Bishops) 
 (for Chronology of Bishops) 
 (for Chronology of Bishops) 
 (for Chronology of Bishops) 

17th-century Italian Roman Catholic bishops
Bishops appointed by Pope Paul V
Bishops appointed by Pope Urban VIII
1576 births
1637 deaths
People from Siena
Benedictine bishops
Bishops of Pienza